Ambrosia arborescens is a species of plant in the family Asteraceae. It is native to the Andes from Colombia south to Bolivia.

In its native range, A. arborescens is used as a medicinal plant with analgesic, antiinflammatory and antiseptic properties.

References

arborescens
Flora of the Andes
Flora of Bolivia
Flora of Colombia
Flora of Ecuador
Flora of Peru
Medicinal plants of South America
Taxa named by Philip Miller